Faith is the fifth studio album by the English synth-pop duo Hurts. It was released on 4 September 2020 by Lento Records. The album was preceded by the singles "Voices", "Suffer", "Redemption" and "Somebody".

Background
In June 2020, along with the release of the second single, "Suffer", Hurts announced that their new album would be released on 4 September 2020.

Promotion

Singles
"Voices" was released as the lead single from the album on 15 May 2020. The song peaked at number 88 on the UK Download Chart. "Suffer" was released as the second single from the album on 24 June 2020. "Redemption" was released as the third single from the album on 16 July 2020. The fourth single from the album, "Somebody", was released on 30 July 2020.

Track listing

Charts

Release history

References

2020 albums
Hurts albums